Chester Golf Club is an English golf club, located in Curzon Park, Chester, Cheshire. The club participates in competitions and inter-club matches. Set on two levels, the 18-hole parkland course is contained within a loop of the River Dee. The clubhouse has a licensed bar.

History
The club was founded on 24 May 1901 and is one of the oldest established golf clubs in the county of Cheshire. Formerly known as "Brueres Halgh" during the early Middle Ages, the land was used for agricultural purposes for many years. During the English Civil War a Parliamentary gun emplacement besieging Chester was used to bombard the northern defences of the city from a location close to where the maintenance sheds now stand.

External links

Golf clubs and courses in Cheshire
Sport in Chester